WBTE (990 AM) is a radio station broadcasting a Gospel format. Licensed to Windsor, North Carolina, United States.  The station is currently owned by Dr. Tine Hicks & Associate.

External links

BTE